The New York Group of Poets (also: The New York Group of Ukrainian Poets, or The New York Group; Ukrainian: Нью-Йоркська Група; N'iu-Iorks'ka hrupa) was a literary movement of Ukrainian refugee modernist poets (and artists) that gathered in New York City during the mid-1950s, imbuing Contemporary Ukrainian literature with avant-garde ideas and with new poetic forms. The poets eagerly experimented and embraced fashionable artistic and philosophical trends as surrealism, magic realism, and existentialism. While the label "New York Group" commonly refers to seven founding members, namely Bohdan Boychuk, Yuriy Tarnawsky, Bohdan Rubchak, Zhenia Vasylkivska, Emma Andijewska, Patrytsiia Kylyna (a pen name of Patricia Nell Warren), and Vira Vovk, it also includes five poets who joined the founders of the group more than a decade later: George Kolomyiets, Oleh Kowerko, Marco Carynnyk, Roman Babowal, and Maria Rewakowicz. These latter poets betrayed the same inclination toward metrical experimentation and display continuity in themes.

The New York Group's most active period spans approximately fifteen years, from the mid-1950s until the early 1970s and coincides with the publication of its annual poetry almanac Novi poezii (New Poetry). In 1990 Boychuk and Rewakowicz, in cooperation with the Writers' Union of Ukraine, founded a literary magazine Svito-vyd in Kyiv, which continued publishing until 1999. The most iconic thematic innovations introduced by the New York Group Drew inspiration both from recent Spanish poetry and from the Latin American boom while incorporating play elements, urban motifs, and erotica.

The phenomenon of the New York Group provides an interesting study for exploring cultural and aesthetic ramifications of writers in exile. Having settled mostly in the United States, the poets welcomed their exilic condition, which had freed them from the constraints of Censorship in the Soviet Union, while also nurturing their link with Ukraine by continuing to write poetry in their mother tongue. This was their way of paying tribute to the poetic history of their language, while incorporating the formal and thematic innovations of the Western world. In fact, some critics drew parallels between the poets of the New York Group and the poets of the Beat Generation, although, arguably, the New York Group displays more affinity with the European modernist tradition than with most other American post-World War II literary movements.

Membership 
The group was created by Bohdan Boychuk and Yuriy Tarnawsky, with Bohdan Rubchak joining soon after.

Poets 
Zhenia Vasylkivska
Emma Andijewska
Patricia Kylyna (Patricia Nell Warren)
Vira Vovk
Maria Rewakowicz
Georges Kolomyiets
Oleh Kowerko
Marco Carynnyk
Roman Babowal

Artists 
Bohdan Pevny
Slava Gerulak
Jurij Solovij

References

American poetry in immigrant languages
History of Ukrainian literature
Ukrainian-American culture
Ukrainian poetry
20th-century American poets
American literary movements
Culture of New York City